Spencer Drew Schwellenbach (born May 31, 2000) is an American professional baseball pitcher and shortstop in the Atlanta Braves organization.

Amateur career
Schwellenbach grew up in Saginaw, Michigan, and attended Heritage High School, where he was a captain of both the baseball and soccer teams. He committed to play college baseball at Nebraska over offers from Michigan and Michigan State after his sophomore season. He was named the Michigan Gatorade Player of the Year and the state's Mr. Baseball as a senior after pitching to a 6–3 win–loss record with a 0.50 earned run average (ERA) and 88 strikeouts in  innings pitched while also hitting for a .367 batting average with 44 runs scored and 20 RBIs. Schwellenbach was selected in the 34th round of the 2018 Major League Baseball Draft by the Cleveland Indians, but opted not to sign with the team. 

As a true freshman, Schwellenbach started 44 on Nebraska's games and batted .275 with five home runs and 22 RBIs. He hit .295 in 15 games as a sophomore before the season was cut short due to the coronavirus pandemic. Following the season he played collegiate summer baseball for the Traverse City Pit Spitters of the Northwoods League, where he hit for a .356 average over 22 games. After only playing as a position player in his first two collegiate seasons, Schwellenbach was added as a relief pitcher. As a junior, he was named Big Ten Player of the Year and was a second team All-American by the Collegiate Baseball Newspaper. He was also named a semifinalist for the Golden Spikes Award. In the NCAA Fayetteville Regional of 2021 NCAA Division I baseball tournament, Schwellenbach pitched  innings of scoreless relief and drove in the game-tying run in a 5–3 win over Arkansas to force a deciding game 7. He was named the winner of the John Olerud Award as the nation's best two-way player after finishing the season with a .284 batting average and a .403 on-base percentage with six home runs and 40 RBIs while also posting a 3–1 record with ten saves and a 0.57 ERA over 18 pitching appearances.

Professional career
Schwellenbach was selected in the second round with the 59th overall pick in the 2021 Major League Baseball draft by the Atlanta Braves. He signed with Atlanta on July 19, 2021, for a $1 million signing bonus. Shortly after signing, it was announced that Schwellenbach would undergo Tommy John surgery to repair the Ulnar collateral ligament in his pitching elbow.

References

External links

Nebraska Cornhuskers bio

2000 births
Living people
Baseball players from Michigan
Baseball pitchers
Baseball shortstops
Nebraska Cornhuskers baseball players
Sportspeople from Saginaw, Michigan